Sokolov's dwarf hamster (Cricetulus sokolovi) is a species of rodent in the hamster and vole family Cricetidae. Previously listed as conspecific with Chinese striped hamster, it has been listed as a separate species since 1988. It has a distinctive dark stripe down its back on and otherwise grey body. It is found in China and Mongolia, and lives in burrows beneath desert shrubs.

Taxonomy
Cricetulus sokolovi was previously attributed to C. barabensis obscurus, but was elevated to species status in 1988 due to differences in its chromosomes and fur. It is named after Russian zoologist Vladimir E. Sokolov.

Description
It’s fur is grey with a brown-yellow hue. A dark stripe runs from the back of a specimen's neck to the base of its tail. This stripe is seen more easily in younger animals and fades with age. Its feet are white and its toes curl upwards. It’s ears are the same color as its fur, with a dark grey spot in the inside middle.

Habitat
Sokolov's dwarf hamster prefers to live in burrows built under desert shrubs in sandy areas. It is found in western and southern Mongolia, including in the northern and eastern Gobi, and in central Inner Mongolia in northern China.

In Mongolia, its main geographical threats are droughts and the drying of water sources. Six percent of its known range in Mongolia is within protected areas.

Reproduction
Reproduction begins in mid-May with two or three litters of between four and nine young produced annually.

References

Cricetulus
Mammals of Asia
Mammals described in 1988
Taxonomy articles created by Polbot